Boosteroid is a Ukrainian video game company that specializes in cloud gaming. It hosts a cloud gaming service containing video games via various game launchers from Steam to Epic Games Store to be directly playable by consumers. On March 14, 2023, Boosteroid and Microsoft announced a 10-year contract to enable players to play titles published by Xbox Game Studios. As of 2023, Boosteroid has 4 million users, making it the largest independent cloud gaming company in the world.

References

Cloud gaming services